This is a summary of the electoral history of Atal Bihari Vajpayee, who was Prime Minister of India in 1996 and again from 1998 till 2004 and Leader of the Bhartiya Janata Party from 1989 to 2004. He was elected to Lok Sabha 10 times from different constituencies during different Lok Sabha tenure. He also served as a Member of Rajya Sabha for 2 terms. He although failed to enter in Parliament 5 times. 

He first contested the 1955 by election in Lucknow Central parliamentary constituency from Bharatiya Jana Sangh but lost against Sheorajvati Nehru of the Indian National Congress and came third candidate with 33,986(28.82%) votes.

Vajpayee entered the parliament for the first time in 1957 representing Balrampur parliamentary constituency. In 1957, Vajpayee contested from three Lok Sabha constituencies; Lucknow, Balrampur and Mathura. Although he lost from Mathura and Lucknow but was elected from Balrampur.

Parliamentary terms

Balrampur (Lok Sabha constituency)
2nd Lok Sabha 1957-62: Atal Bihari Vajpayee, Bharatiya Jana Sangh
4th Lok Sabha 1967-71: Atal Bihari Vajpayee, Bharatiya Jana Sangh

Gwalior (Lok Sabha constituency)
5th Lok Sabha 1971-77: Atal Bihari Vajpayee, Bharatiya Jan Sangh

New Delhi (Lok Sabha constituency)
6th Lok Sabha  1977-80 Atal Bihari Vajpayee, Janata Party
7th Lok Sabha 1980-84 Atal Bihari Vajpayee, Janata Party

Gandhinagar (Lok Sabha constituency)
11th Lok Sabha 1996-96 Atal Bihari Vajpayee, Bharatiya Janata Party
*He vacated this seat and retained Lucknow

Lucknow (Lok Sabha constituency)
10th Lok Sabha 1991-96 Atal Bihari Vajpayee, Bharatiya Janata Party
11th Lok Sabha 1996-98 Atal Bihari Vajpayee, Bharatiya Janata Party
12th Lok Sabha  1998-99 Atal Bihari Vajpayee, Bharatiya Janata Party
13th Lok Sabha 1999–2004 Atal Bihari Vajpayee, Bharatiya Janata Party
14th Lok Sabha 2004-09  Atal Bihari Vajpayee, Bharatiya Janata Party

Election Results

1955 bypoll results

1957 results

Lucknow (lost)

Mathura (lost)

Balrampur (won)

1962 results

Lucknow (lost)

Balrampur (lost)

1967 : Balrampur (won)

1971 Gwalior (won)

1977 New Delhi (won)

1980 New Delhi (won)

1984 Gwalior (lost)

1989 Election
 The only time between 1957 and 2004 that A B Vajpayee did not contest the election. He was already a member of Rajya Sabha.

1991 Lucknow (won)

1996 Gandhinagar (won)

*He vacated this seat and retained Lucknow

1996 Lucknow (won)

Lucknow Lok Sabha constituency

1998 Lucknow (won)

1999 Lucknow (won)

2004 Lucknow (won)

See also
Electoral history of Narendra Modi 
Electoral history of L. K. Advani

References

Electoral history of Indian politicians
Atal Bihari Vajpayee